Omar Álvarez Burgos (born 29 August 1990) is a Spanish footballer who plays for SD Formentera as a forward.

Club career
Born in Oviedo, Asturias, Álvarez graduated from Cultural y Deportiva Leonesa, after a stint with hometown's Real Oviedo. He made his debut as a senior with the reserves in the 2009–10 campaign in Tercera División, also appearing with the main squad in Segunda División B.

In June 2010 Álvarez moved to CA Osasuna B, also in the third level. In September 2013, after the Navarrese side's relegation, he moved abroad for the first time in his career, joining Football League Greece side Fokikos A.C.

Álvarez played his first match as a professional on 30 September, starting and playing the full 90 minutes in a 2–2 home draw against Kallithea F.C. He scored his first goal on 24 November, scoring the winner in a 2–1 home success over Episkopi F.C.

On 12 July 2014 Álvarez returned to Spain, joining Marino de Luanco in the third division.

References

External links
 
 Futbolme profile  
 

1990 births
Living people
People from Oviedo
Spanish footballers
Footballers from Asturias
Association football forwards
Segunda División B players
Tercera División players
Cultural Leonesa footballers
CA Osasuna B players
Marino de Luanco footballers
Arandina CF players
SD Formentera players
Football League (Greece) players
Fokikos A.C. players
Spanish expatriate footballers
Spanish expatriate sportspeople in Greece
Expatriate footballers in Greece